The Old Town Hall in Næstved, Denmark, dates from about 1450. It was extended with an extra floor in the 16th century. It is the only Danish medieval town hall building which exists today. It is located next to St. Peter's Church.

References

Listed city and town halls in Denmark
Listed buildings and structures in Næstved Municipality
Gothic architecture in Denmark
Næstved